The Dallas Diamonds were a team in the Women's Professional Basketball League (abbreviated WBL) from 1979 to 1981 and the Women's American Basketball Association (abbreviated WABA) in 1984.

The Diamonds were an expansion team for the 1979–1980 season, along with the California Dream, New Orleans Pride, Philadelphia Fox, San Francisco Pioneers, St. Louis Streak, and the Washington Metros.

The Diamonds owner, Judson Phillips, hired legendary women's basketball coach, Dean Weese, of the Wayland Baptist Flying Queens.  They also secured radio rights for their games with KAAM of Dallas.  These games were broadcast by Eric Nadel, who later became the voice of the Texas Rangers baseball team.

In the 1979 Draft the Diamonds selected: Alfredda Abernathy (1st), Valerie Goodwin (2nd), Christy Earnhardt (3rd), Sharon McClanahan (4th), Heidi Nolte (5th), Cindy Bruton (6th), Joanette Boutte (7th), Diann Nestle (8th), Deneice Gray (9th), and Beth Anman (10th).  Several of these players were former Wayland Baptist stars under Dean Weese.

The 1979-80 season began 11/23/79 with a loss against New Orleans 106-93.  Returning to the Dallas Convention Center the Diamonds beat California 116-100 to even their record at 1-1.  They then lost their next 7 in a row.  By the end of 1979 their record was 3-11.

The Diamonds biggest victory was over the New York Stars (28-7), who would become the WBL Champions for the 1979–1980 season.  The 115-100 home victory would be the last Diamonds victory this season as they ended the year with an 11-game losing streak.  When the losing streak reached 5 games (7-22), Dean Weese was relieved of his coaching duties in favor of Ray Scott.  The team under Coach Scott lost their last 6 games to end the year 7-28.

From a statistical standpoint Alfredda Abernathy (Alabama State) had a phenomenal year as she averaged 27.0 points and 14.3 rebounds per game.  As a team the Diamonds were 7-11 at home and 0-17 on the road.

The Diamonds added new ownership during the season as Dallas real estate investor Mike Staver took over the team.  Mike Staver, along with General Manager Nancy Nichols, began a search to improve the team.  They hired Houston Angels' assistant coach Greg Williams as their new coach. Greg was instrumental in the Angels winning the 1st WBL Championship in 1978–1979.  The Angels were also a playoff team in 79-80 as well.

The last place finish gave the Diamonds 1st pick in the 1980-1981 and that pick was Old Dominion's Nancy Lieberman.

The star of both incarnations of the team was Nancy Lieberman, an Olympic medalist and former All-American.

The Diamonds went from 7-28 to 27-9 in one season and it all started with the outstanding talent from the 1980 draft.  The Diamonds drafted: Nancy Lieberman (1st Old Dominion), Peggie Gillom (2nd  Mississippi U), Hattie Browning (3rd  Texas), Gwen Walker (4th  Arkansas-Monticello), Mary Murphy (5th  Northwestern), Vanessa Barnes (6th  Tuskegee), Julie Maxey (7th  Missouri), Sherri Fancher  (8th  Carson-Newman), Brenda Winfield (9th  Winston-Salem), and Linda Newcomb (10th  Northeastern La.).  A significant signing came from an undrafted player from Erskine College named Rosalind "Pig" Jennings who would be voted 2nd Team All-WBL in 1981.

Dallas began with a home victory at their new home, Moody Coliseum on the SMU campus, on December 5, but followed it up with a road loss in New Jersey.  This would be Dallas' 18th consecutive road loss.  This streak was broken on December 9 with a 102-92 victory against the New England Gulls.  The Diamonds would end 1980 with a 5-2 record.  At the end of January their record improved to 10-6 and 18-7 by the end of February.

During the year the Diamonds major competition came from the Nebraska Wranglers.  As the season was drawing to a close the 2 teams were fighting for home court advantage in the playoffs.  On March 30 the Diamonds met for the 6th time.  The Diamond needed to outscore Nebraska by 26 points to secure home court.  The 108-85 victory just fell short of their goal.

Dallas' playoff opponent was the New Jersey Gems.  NJ took the 1st game (4/3/81) 91-86 at St. Peter's College.  Dallas won the next game (4/4/81) 92-85 at SMU before 3,278 fans.  Dallas eliminated the Gems with a 107-88 victory before 4,482 fans.  Gems' Carol Blazejowski finished with 36 points on 15-26 shooting, while Nancy Lieberman scored 35 points and had 10 rebounds for the Diamonds.

The Championship series would match the 27-9 Diamonds and the 27-9 Wranglers.  Nebraska took game one in Omaha by the score of 89-72.  Dallas took game 2 in Omaha 106-93.  On Good Friday April 17 Dallas took game 3 96-88 before 8,117 fans.  In Game 4, before 7,886 excited fans, Dallas took a 76-64 lead into the 4th quarter, but eventually lost 94-93.  This set up the 5th and final game in Omaha where the Wranglers took the 3rd and last WBL Championship 99-90.

The new WBL team was popular in Dallas and one time had a playoff game crowd that outdrew the new NBA team, the Dallas Mavericks.

Greg Williams coached both teams. In the 1980–1981 season, the team went 27-9 and he was named WBL Coach of the Year. After working at Southern Methodist University, he was named head coach of the WABA Dallas Diamonds. With his leadership, the team posted a 19-2 record. The team was the league champion and Williams was named WABA Coach of the Year.

The WABA folded after a single season.

References

Basketball teams in Dallas
Defunct basketball teams in Texas
Women's Professional Basketball League teams
1979 establishments in Texas
1984 disestablishments in Texas
Basketball teams established in 1979
Sports clubs disestablished in 1984
Women's sports in Texas